José Benito Patricio Gabriel López Uraga was a 19th century Mexican general. He participated and fought in the Mexican–American War, the Reform War and the Second French intervention in Mexico. He also served as the Mexican ambassador to Germany from April 13, 1853 to November 12, 1855.

Biography
He was born in Valladolid (modern-day Morelia, Michoacán) on March 17, 1808, as the son of José Benito López Fernández and María de la Luz Uraga y Gutiérrez. He participated in the Mexican–American War and initially participated in the Battle of Palo Alto. He then promoted the Tolimán Plan but after being captured, he fled to the United States. When the Reform War broke out, López returned to side with the Liberals but lost a leg in combat and was taken prisoner in Guadalajara by the Conservatives. López was praised by General Pedro Ogazón for his services rendered at Jalisco. He also manged to capture the village of Camargo on November 29, 1851.

Once released on April 13, 1853, he was granted the position of Ambassador to Prussia, presenting his credentials as ambassador of Mexico to the King of Prussia, Friedrich Wilhelm IV on September 3, 1853 and on October 23, 1853, he established relations with the King of Saxony, Johann, ending his diplomatic mission on November 12, 1855. On 1857, Don Benito Juárez granted López the Islas Marías with the condition of not selling or renting them to any foreign power.

At the start of the Second French intervention in Mexico, he commanded the Army of the East. On February 9, 1862, he was removed from office and replaced by Ignacio Zaragoza. In 1864, he was the commanding general in Jalisco and general in chief of the Army of the Center but after having personal conflicts with Colonel Antonio Rojas, he returned to Mexico City. On July 26 of that year, he switched sides to side with the Second Mexican Empire. When Carlota of Mexico left for Europe to seek support for her husband, López Uraga went with her as an escort, a fact that caused him to be considered a traitor to the country and revoked his ownership of the Islas Marías.

After the victory of the Republicans and due to the Amnesty Law issued by the government of Don Benito Juárez, the former General López Uraga recovered ownership of the Islas Marías in 1878. The islands were then sold in 1879 to Don Manuel Carpena, a resident of Tepic, Nayarit for 45,000 pesos. Later López lived in exile, dying in San Francisco, California on February 4, 1885.

References

1808 births
1885 deaths
Liberalism in Mexico
Mexican generals
Mexican monarchists
Politicians from Nuevo León
Military personnel from Michoacán
Second French intervention in Mexico
19th-century Mexican military personnel
19th-century Mexican politicians
Exiled Mexican politicians